Ágnes Hegedűs (born 1949) is a Hungarian orienteering competitor. At the 1970 World Orienteering Championships in Friedrichroda she finished 6th in the individual event, and received a silver medal in the relay with the Hungarian team (with Magda Horváth and Sarolta Monspart). In the  1972 World Orienteering Championships she finished fourth in the relay, also with Horváth and Monspart.

References

1949 births
Living people
Hungarian orienteers
Female orienteers
Foot orienteers
World Orienteering Championships medalists